Marquess of Vargas Llosa is a hereditary title in the Spanish nobility granted in 2011 by Juan Carlos I to Mario Vargas Llosa, renowned writer and Nobel laureate.

His style of address is: Ilustrísimo Señor Marqués de Vargas Llosa ("The Most Illustrious The Marquess of Vargas Llosa").

The heir apparent is the 1st Marquess' eldest child, Álvaro Vargas Llosa.

Marquesses of Vargas Llosa
 Jorge Mario Pedro Vargas Llosa, 1st Marquess of Vargas Llosa (2011–)

References

Marquessates in the Spanish nobility
Noble titles created in 2011
Mario Vargas Llosa
Vargas Llosa family